Slovenia competed at the 2012 Winter Youth Olympics in Innsbruck, Austria. The Slovenian team consisted of 21 athletes which competed in 9 sports.

Medalists

Alpine skiing

Slovenia qualified four athletes.

Boys

Girls

Team

Biathlon

Slovenia qualified four athletes.

Boys

Girls

Mixed

Cross-country skiing

Slovenia qualified four athletes.

Boys

Girls

Sprint

Mixed

Freestyle skiing

Slovenia qualified one athlete.

Ski Half-Pipe

Ice hockey

Slovenia qualified two athletes.

Boys

Girls

Nordic combined

Slovenia qualified one athlete.

Boys

Skeleton

Slovenia qualified one athlete.

Girls

Ski jumping

Slovenia qualified two athletes.

Boys

Girls

Team w/Nordic Combined

Snowboarding

Slovenia qualified two athletes.

Boys

See also
Slovenia at the 2012 Summer Olympics

References

2012 in Slovenian sport
Nations at the 2012 Winter Youth Olympics
Slovenia at the Youth Olympics